urpmi is a package management tool for installing, removing, updating and querying software packages of local or remote (networked) media. It wraps around the RPM Package Manager in the role of a smart package manager. It uses repositories and will resolve dependencies so that the user will not suffer from dependency hell that can happen when using RPM directly. It works with official sources from Mandriva or unofficial sources such as those from the Penguin Liberation Front. It has a graphical front-end: Rpmdrake.

It's made of 2 parts:
 a low level C/perl bindings
 a higher level perl code implementing the advanced algorithms

In addition to the now-defunct Mandriva Linux, it is also being used by:
Uruk GNU/Linux, a 100% free software system origin in Iraq, based on this package manager virtually for Uruk package manager simulator, and Linux-libre kernels and apt real package manager from Trisquel, also named after a city in Iraq
Mageia, a French fork of Mandriva Linux that for a time was the base for future Mandriva products but is now an independent community driven Linux distribution.
ROSA Linux, a Russian fork of Mandriva Linux that is the base for future OpenMandriva products.

History
urpmi was developed as an experiment by Pascal Rigaux (Pixel) to address RPM install limitations; it was further maintained by François Pons and different Mandriva employees. It is currently (2010-2021) maintained by Thierry Vignaud who was the maintainer of rpmdrake and one of the co-maintainers of the drakx installer and tools at Mandriva before he continued doing that job at Mageia.

Per Øyvind Karlsen maintained a fork of urpmi at Rosa Linux, backporting fixes and improvements from Thierry Vignaud work, but this is not the version that was used by Mandriva Business Server (which was based on Mageia). This fork died around 2013 (date of last commit).

Commands

Generic commands

Useful commands

See also
AppStream
PackageKit

References

External links
 
 CPAN page for the low level C/perl bindings
 CPAN page for the high level perl code

Free package management systems
Linux package management-related software
Mandriva Linux